Klaus Wunderlich (18 June 1931 – 28 October 1997) was a famous German easy listening organist.

Biography 
Wunderlich was born in Chemnitz. He played the Hammond organ model C3 then mid 60s changed to model Hammond H100. Wunderlich also tried new sounds and released an album exclusively played on Hohner instruments: model Planet T, Clavinet D6 and String Melody string synthesizer (also branded as Logan String Melody.) With the introduction of the first synthesizers, Wunderlich briefly used Moog synthesizer and produced three albums with the instrument. He later combined the sound of a Hammond organ model H 100 with a Lowrey Organ Model H25-3 and Wersi model W248S which was called the "New Pop Organ Sound". Wunderlich switched to Wersi organs permanently with the introduction of the Wersi Helios model in 1976, with which he created his own unique electronic sound. During the course of time, the Wersi Helios was not sufficient to keep up with current technology and trends so Wunderlich started to use Wersi Beta Dx400. The Beta was then combined with the Wersi Helios to again create a unique sound. The 1980s saw Wunderlich purchase the Wersi Pianostar electronic piano which he used for rhythm guitar effects only.

In 1988, Wunderlich decided to part company with the Wersi Helios and Beta and purchased a new organ to replace both older models, the Wersi Spectra.

Wunderlich also used a small Moog synthesizer Minimoog to replicate the sound of the Bass guitar on his recordings as well as in the latter half of his career playing the drums and percussion on his recordings.

As a musician Wunderlich was open to different music styles and played classical, operetta, Broadway musical, as well as popular music. He sold more than 20 million records globally, and received 13 golden albums as well as one golden cassette.

Wunderlich died in Engen from a heart attack, and was subsequently buried in the Alter Friedhof at Sindelfingen.

Some of his work was incorporated into the Soviet cartoon, Nu Pogodi!

In 2017 a documentary film about Klaus Wunderlich was released by Duke Denver Film IVS called Wunderlich. The year after a sequel was released called Wunderlich Stories.

Over the years his recordings have been sampled by a number of other artists. One of the most notable and unusual is the use of multiple elements, including the distinctive organ from his version of the Lynsey de Paul song "Sugar Me" that was sampled by Guru (rapper) on track 5 on his 2000 album "Jazzmatazz Vol. 3: Streetsoul" called "Certified" performed by Bilal (American singer).

Discography (small selection)
Wunderlich released more than one hundred albums, of which thirteen LP's and one music cassette was credited with gold. In the following overview the chart positions in Germany, the United Kingdom and the Netherlands are given:

References

External links
Wunderlich's website in German and English
Sunkit's page about Klaus Wunderlich in Swedish
Klaus Wunderlich documentary films website
Wunderlich documentary film on IMDB

1931 births
1997 deaths
People from Chemnitz
German organists
German male organists
Easy listening musicians
20th-century German musicians
20th-century organists
20th-century German male musicians